Tamburica ( or ) or tamboura (sometimes written tamburrizza or tamburitza), refers to a family of long-necked lutes popular in Southern Europe and Central Europe, especially Serbia (in Vojvodina, Mačva and Posavo-Tamnava), Bosnia and Herzegovina, Croatia (of which it is the national string instrument), Slovenia, and Hungary ( predominantly amongst its ethnic South Slavic minority groups). It is also known in Burgenland, Austria. All took their name and some characteristics from the Persian tanbur but also resemble the mandolin and guitar in the sense that its strings are plucked and often paired. The frets may be moveable to allow the playing of various modes. The variety of tamburica shapes known today were developed in Serbia and Croatia by a number of indigenous contributors near the end of the 19th century.

History

There is little reliable data showing how the tamboura entered Central Europe. It already existed during Byzantine Empire, and the Greeks and Slavs used to call "pandouras" (see pandoura) or "tambouras" the ancestor of modern bouzouki. The instrument was referred to as θαμπούριν, thambourin in the Byzantine Empire (confer Digenis Akritas, Escorial version, vv. 826–827, ed. and transl. Elizabeth Jeffrey).

It is said it was probably brought by the Turks to Bosnia, from where the instrument spread further with migrations of Šokci and Bunjevci above the Sava River to all parts of Croatia, Serbia and further, although this theory is not consistent with the generally accepted view that the ancestor of the tamboura is the ancient Greek pandouris.

Until the Great Migration of the Serbs at the end of the 17th century, the type of tambura most frequently used in Croatia and Serbia had a long neck and two or three strings (sometimes doubled). Similar string instruments include the Czech bratsche, Turkish saz and the sargija, çiftelia and bouzouki.  The oldest surviving and authenticated tambura known, which is still kept in a museum in Osijek, dates from 1847 and was owned by Pajo Kolarić of Osijek, who was also the founder of the first amateur tamburica orchestra. In honour of 
him, a festival called tamburitzan is held every year in Osijek.

The development process of the modern tamburica was initiated by several Serbian and Croatian citizens over a period of time. The original long neck, pear shaped tamburica was called the samica and it came in a small or larger size. The kontra, which had 4 strings tuned in an upper A chord was used only as an accompaniment instrument, it originated in Dalmatia. During the autumn of 1875, after a rebellion in Bosnia had broken out, many refugees arrived in Sremski Karlovci. Among these refugees was a man named Marko Capkun who brought two tamburas with him. He called the small one icitel and the larger one sarkija. These tamburas did not use wire strings but rather gut strings pulled through little holes on the neck and tied behind. A woodworker, Josif, in Sremski Karlovci began to make Marko's tamburas, but instead of the traditional pear shape, he made them into the shape of a little guitar. A bird catcher named Joza built a large tambura-much bigger than a guitar in 1877 or 1878. It stretched two thicker and two thinner strings on it and Joza called it the bas or berdon. They developed an orchestra with a little tambura called the prima , 5 kontra and 1 bas.

Types of tamburica

The number of strings on a tamburica varies and it may have single or double-coursed strings or a mixture of both. Double-coursed strings are tuned in unison. The basic forms of tamburica are (Serbian and Croatian name is given with Hungarian name in the parenthesis, if different):

The Samica – is a solo instrument that is rarely found as a part of the standard tamburica orchestra. The samica is thought to be the ancestor of the modern tamburica and usually consists of two doubled strings. The samica is traditionally played in Slavonia, Baranja and Vojvodina.
The Dangubica - Also known as a "Razbibriga", "Kozarica", "Tikvara", "Potpalac" or "Kuterevka" is another solo instrument very similar to the samica in both shape and sound. It is predominantly played in and around the region of Lika. It is typically larger than the samica and tuned to a lower note.

The Tambura Trožica - is a lesser known tambura with three strings (hence the name "trožica" lit. "three stringed"). It was played in the Bosanska Krajina and kozara.

The prim (prím) – one double string, E, and three single strings B, F#, C#. This is the smallest tamburica (about 50 cm long), but is very loud. It is mostly used as a lead instrument or harmonizing instrument. The bisernica (from Serbian and Croatian "biser" meaning "pearl") is almost identical but may have two double strings and two single strings.
The brač or basprim (brács or basszprím) – three double strings, or two double strings and three single strings (basprim), a slightly bigger, lower instrument than the bisernica but played in a similar fashion.
The čelović – originally two double strings and two single strings; now four single strings are more common.
The bugarija or kontra (brácsó or kontra) – one double string D and three single strings, similar to a guitar, mostly plays chords on the "back beat" for rhythm. A bugarija has five strings, the bottom pair are D, the middle string is A and the top two are tuned F# and F#.
The čelo (cselló) – four strings, similar in size to the bugarija and plays a counterpoint line which is usually improvised.
The bas or berda (tamburabőgő), also called begeš (bőgős) – four strings. It is the largest instrument in the tamburica family, and is similar to contrabass. It can only be played standing and is used for playing bass lines.

There is a view that the first tambura orchestra was formed in Hungary in the 19th century. The instruments' names came from the Hungarian names of the musical instruments of the symphony orchestra ("cselló" meaning cello, "bőgő" meaning contrabass) and from the Hungarian Gipsy bands (bőgős, prím, kontra). These orchestras soon spread to what is now Bosnia, Austria, Slovenia, the Czech Republic and Slovakia.

Parts of tamburica
The tamburica is made in three parts; body, neck and head. The body (sound box) was pear-shaped until the middle of the nineteenth century CE, and was built by scooping out the log. Today they are mostly built in the way of the guitar and even the smallest, the bisernica, has a constructed box. The fingerboard has frets. The head usually had a sharpened form, which can be found still on some bisernicas, but the "snail" design later got the supremacy. The snail headstock design dates from at least the 19th century and the Viennese guitars of Johann Georg Stauffer.

Composers and ensembles

Tamburica orchestras can have various formats from a trio to a large orchestra. A basic trio consists of a prim, a kontra and a čelo. Larger orchestras also have bas-prims and bass-prim-terc tamburas.

The first major composer for the tamburica was Pajo Kolarić, who formed the first amateur tamburica orchestra in Osijek in 1847. Kolarić's student Mijo Majer formed the first tamburica choir led by a conductor, the "Hrvatska Lira", in 1882. Croatian composers for the tamburica include Franjo Ksaver Kuhač, Siniša Leopold and Julije Njikoš. The instrument is associated with Croatian nationalism. Vinko Žganec, an associate of Béla Bartók, collected more than 19,000 Croatian folk songs.

The Grand Tamburica Orchestra of Radio Novi Sad was founded in 1951 under the leadership of Sava Vukosavljev, who composed and arranged many pieces for tamburica orchestra and published a comprehensive book Vojvođanska tambura ("The Tambura of Vojvodina"). There are also orchestras of Radio Belgrade and Radio Podgorica, Radio Kikinda etc. Janika Balaž, a member of the Radio Novi Sad orchestra who also had his own octet, was a popular performer whose name became synonymous with the tamburica. Famous tamburica orchestras of Serbia include those of Maksa Popov and Aleksandar Aranicki.

The village of Schandorf in Austria, whose Croatian-speaking inhabitants are descended from 16th Century Croatian immigrants, is the home of a tamburica orchestra, a reflection of its ethnic heritage. The orchestra performs frequently, often outside the village.

In popular culture

Films about tamburicas 
The Popovich Brothers of South Chicago (1978)
Directed by Jill Godmilow, Martin Koenig and Ethel Raim. Produced by Mary Koenig, Ethel Raim and Jill Godmilow.
Ziveli! Medicine for the Heart (1987)
Filmed and directed by Les Blank. Produced by Flower Films in association with the Center for Visual Anthropology, University of Southern California. Based on ethnography by Andre Simic. El Cerrito, California: Flower Films & Video. .

Publications 
Svet Tambure, a magazine about tambura music, published triannually in Serbia.

See also
Tambouras
Tanpura
Tambura
Tanbur
Tambur
Marko Nešić (born 1872)
Zvonko Bogdan

References

External links

TamburicaOrg – tamburaški portal – tambura portal
Tamburizza.at – Tamburizza Verein Ivan Vukovic-Parndorf
Tambura.com.hr 
Tamburica Association of America
About tamburica – short history
The Tamburitza and the preservation of Croatian folk music, by Michael B. Savor (Canada)
The San Francisco Tamburitza Festival

Music samples
"Ugrós, lassú és friss csárdás", from Bátmonostor, Hungary 
"Aki leány akar lenni" (csárdás), from Bogyiszló, Hungary Publikált népzenei felvételek -- On-line adatbázis
"Lassú csárdás", from Dávod, Hungary Publikált népzenei felvételek -- On-line adatbázis
"Zvečera se šečem", Tamburica ensemble "Ivan Vuković", Parndorf, Austria Tamburaško društvo Ivan Vuković Pandrof - Shop
Z. Tonković: "Sjene" (Croatia)
Janika Balaž and his orchestra: "Fala" (Croatia/Zagorje) audio&foto
"Deronjski valcer", from Deronje, Serbia audio&foto

Bosnian musical instruments
Montenegrin musical instruments
Croatian musical instruments
Culture of Vojvodina
Serbian musical instruments
Hungarian musical instruments
Slovenian musical instruments
String instruments